Dennis Michael Wright Jr. (born January 3, 1990) is an American professional baseball pitcher for the Saraperos de Saltillo of the Mexican League. He has previously played in Major League Baseball (MLB) for the Baltimore Orioles, Seattle Mariners, and White Sox, and in the KBO League for the NC Dinos. Wright played college baseball for East Carolina University.

Amateur career
Wright attended East Carolina University, and in 2010 he played collegiate summer baseball with the Harwich Mariners of the Cape Cod Baseball League.

Professional career

Baltimore Orioles
He was selected by the Baltimore Orioles in the third round of the 2011 Major League Baseball Draft. During his first professional season he went 3-2 with a 5.72 earned run average with 42 strikeouts in  innings. Pitching for the Frederick Keys and Bowie Baysox in 2012 he went 10-5 with a 4.06 ERA.

Wright started the 2013 season with Baysox. He finished the season with the Norfolk Tides. He was the Jim Palmer Minor League Pitcher of the Year Award after going 11–3 with a 3.11 ERA and 138 strikeouts. He returned to Norfolk to start the 2014 season.

2015
Wright made his first career major league start on May 17, 2015 against the Los Angeles Angels of Anaheim. He went  innings, striking out 6, allowed 4 hits, no runs, and no walks in order to get the win, 3-0. In 12 games, 9 of them starts, Wright went 3-5 with a 6.04 ERA in  innings.

2016
Wright was named the Orioles fourth starter at the conclusion of Spring Training. He began in the rotation but struggled and was sent down to the minors. He split time between the O's rotation and the AAA level. In 18 games for the Orioles, 12 of them being in the rotation, Wright went 3-4 with a 5.79 ERA in  innings.

2017
Wright spent the majority of the season at the AAA level, receiving a callup to the Majors towards the end of the season. He finished with a 5.76 ERA in 13 games.

2018
Wright pitched exclusively out of the bullpen for the O's, totaling 48 appearances. He finished with  innings pitched.

2019
Wright was on the Opening day roster for the Orioles. He had an ERA of 9.45 through 10 appearances. On April 21, 2019, Wright was designated for assignment to make space for Gabriel Ynoa on the roster.

Seattle Mariners
On April 24, 2019, he was traded to the Seattle Mariners for infielder Ryne Ogren. He was designated for assignment on May 19, 2019 and placed at Triple-A with the Tacoma Rainiers. On June 23, he was called up by the Mariners. He pitched in nine games for the Mariners before he was designated for assignment again on July 5  and he returned to Triple-A with the Tacoma Rainiers. He elected free agency on October 1.

NC Dinos
On November 22, 2019, Wright signed a one-year contract with the NC Dinos of the KBO League. He went 11-9 in 29 starts for the Dinos. He became a free agent following the season.

Chicago White Sox
On December 24, 2020, Wright signed a minor league contract with the Chicago White Sox organization. He was assigned to the Triple-A Charlotte Knights to begin the year. On August 16, 2021, Wright was selected to the active roster. Wright pitched 18 innings for the White Sox, recording a 5.50 ERA with 11 strikeouts. On October 1, 2021, Wright was designated for assignment by Chicago. On October 8, Wright elected free agency.

Los Angeles Dodgers
On March 14, 2022, Wright signed a minor league contract with the Los Angeles Dodgers. He pitched in 10 games for the AAA Oklahoma City Dodgers, with six starts and had a 4.46 ERA when the Dodgers released him on June 1st.

Chicago White Sox (second stint)
On June 5, 2022, Wright signed a minor league contract with the Chicago White Sox and was assigned to the Triple-A Charlotte Knights. He elected free agency on November 10, 2022.

Saraperos de Saltillo
On March 3, 2023, Wright signed with the Saraperos de Saltillo of the Mexican League.

Pitching style
Wright throws 5 pitches: a four seam fastball that averages around 96 MPH, a sinker at around 93, a changeup at around 82, a slider at about 86, and a curveball at around 75.

References

External links

East Carolina Pirates bio

1990 births
Living people
People from Bennettsville, South Carolina
Baseball players from South Carolina
Major League Baseball pitchers
KBO League pitchers
American expatriate baseball players in South Korea
Baltimore Orioles players
Seattle Mariners players
NC Dinos players
Chicago White Sox players
East Carolina Pirates baseball players
Harwich Mariners players
Gulf Coast Orioles players
Aberdeen IronBirds players
Delmarva Shorebirds players
Frederick Keys players
Bowie Baysox players
Mesa Solar Sox players
Norfolk Tides players
Tacoma Rainiers players
Charlotte Knights players
Oklahoma City Dodgers players